John Staniford Robinson (November 10, 1804 – April 25, 1860) was an American lawyer and politician.  He is most notable for his service as the 22nd governor of Vermont, from 1853 to 1854.

Biography
Robinson was born in Bennington, Vermont, the son of Nathan Robinson and Jerusha Staniford.  Governor and United States Senator Moses Robinson was his grandfather, and Senator Jonathan Robinson and Vermont House Speaker Samuel Robinson were his great-uncles.  He graduated in 1824 from Williams College, studied law and passed the bar in 1827.  In October, 1847 he married Mrs. Juliette Staniford Robinson, widow of William Robinson.  They had no children.

Career
Robinson opened his own law office in Bennington and continued to practice until his death.  He served in local offices including justice of the peace, and was a member of the Vermont House of Representatives from 1832 to 1833 and the Vermont Senate from 1838 to 1839.  Robinson's political aspirations were somewhat thwarted by the fracturing of the Democratic Party over slavery; in 1851, he was the unsuccessful gubernatorial candidate of the anti-slavery Democrats who organized themselves as the Free Soil and Liberty Parties.  In 1852, he was the unsuccessful Democratic nominee.

He placed second in the 1853 election, but no candidate received a majority.  In such cases, the Vermont General Assembly chooses a winner; after several unsuccessful ballots during the month of October, the legislature chose Robinson over the first-place finisher, Whig candidate Erastus Fairbanks, after a number of Liberty Party legislators who had supported Lawrence Brainerd switched their support to Robinson.  Serving from 1853 to 1854, he was the first Democratic Governor of Vermont and remained the only Democrat elected to the governorship for 110 years.  The Republican winning streak ended when Democrat Philip H. Hoff won the governorship in 1962.

Death
In 1860, while Robinson was serving as chairman of the Vermont delegation to the Democratic National Convention in Charleston, South Carolina, he died from apoplexy (a stroke).  He is interred at Old Bennington Cemetery in Bennington, Vermont.

References

External links
 
The Political Graveyard
National Governors Association
List of Governors, Vermont History & Genealogy

1804 births
1860 deaths
Williams College alumni
Democratic Party governors of Vermont
Democratic Party members of the Vermont House of Representatives
Democratic Party Vermont state senators
Vermont lawyers
People from Bennington, Vermont
19th-century American politicians
19th-century American lawyers